Rory Penttinen (born 30 October 1979) is a Finnish racing driver born in Nykarleby, Finland who in 2021 drives in the Asian Le Mans Series with United Autosports and European Le Mans Series with Graff Racing.

Racing career
Penttinen's international career started in 2007 when he won the world championship in the Legends series finals in California USA. Since that he has raced different car types in several different series. Among other highlights in his career is the victory at the Nurburgring 24H race 2014 with Hyundai Germany and the Dubai 24H victory in 2017 in a Lamborghini Huracan with GDL-racing.

Penttinen is known for being a fast and reliable endurance driver, he has the ability to learn new cars and tracks in a short time and performs best when he is put under pressure. When Penttinen in June 2017 applied for a FIA bronze license, and made a debut in the Blancpain GT SERIES in a Ferrari 488 GT3 with Rinaldi racing, he finished third in class in the race.

2017 to 2019 Penttinen mainly raced GT3 cars (Ferrari 488 GT) with Rinaldi Racing and Kessel Racing but also did some other endurance races such as 25H VW FunCup in a Beetle and N24 with GDL Motorsport.

Racing highlights

Season 2020
In 2020 Penttinen raced for Graff Racing in the Michelin Le Mans Cup. His teammate was Matthias Kaiser.

In the seasons first race at Paul Ricard, in July, Penttinen and Kaiser finished 3rd.

In the second race, at Spa-Francorchamps, car #26 finished 5th.

In the third round, that was moved from Spain to France (due to COVID-19) and held the 29th of August at Paul Ricard the Graff duo Penttinen and Kaiser did a phenomenal job. In the qualification Penttinen took the podium and he also led the race for 26 laps. Their final results from Paul Ricard was P2 and after the race they are now second in the series.

Before the final race in Portimao the duo was in 4th place in the fight for the championship. In theory it was possible to end the season on the podium and in the race both drivers did a great job behind the wheel and they crossed the finish line as P1, unfortunately they got a time penalty and the final result was P7. Despite this mistake they were P3 overall.

Season 2021
Started in February 2021, Penttinen was then racing in the Asian Le Mans Series in Dubai and Abu Dhabi for the British team United Autosports. Driving the LMP3 car #23 together with Wayne Boyd and Manuel Maldonado.

Also in 2021 Penttinen is driving for the French team Graff Racing in the full 6 races European Le Mans Series together with Matthias Kaiser in LMP3 car #9.

Racing Record

Career Summary

References

External links

1979 births
Living people
People from Nykarleby
Finnish racing drivers
24H Series drivers
Sportspeople from Ostrobothnia (region)
Nürburgring 24 Hours drivers
Blancpain Endurance Series drivers
Asian Le Mans Series drivers
European Le Mans Series drivers
United Autosports drivers
Graff Racing drivers
Le Mans Cup drivers
Iron Lynx drivers
Hyundai Motorsport drivers